B2takes! (also stylized as B2takes!!) is a Japanese boy band formed in 2012 by Bacs Entertainment.

History

B2takes! was formed in December 2012 by Bacs Entertainment. In August 2015, the group released "Hanabi" as their debut single. In 2018, B2takes! made their major label debut through King Records with the double A-side single "Brand New Anniversary" / "Not Alone." "Not Alone" was used as the theme song to the film , which Ozawa starred in. Ozawa and Wataru departed from the group during their 6th anniversary concert in November 2018; however, Wataru later rejoined. In June 2019, Ryosuke Chiba, Manaya Yajima, Kazuya Yuuki, and YouJin were added as new members to the group. In July 2020, B2takes!'s official website announced that YouJin would be leaving the group and terminating his contract with their agency at the end of August 2020.

Members

Current
 
 
 Igu
 
 
 
 
 
  (2019-present)
  (2019-present)
  (2019-present)

Former
 Ren Ozawa (2013-2018)
 YouJin (2019-2020)

Discography

Singles

Notes

References

External links

 

Japanese boy bands
Japanese idol groups
Musical groups established in 2012
2012 establishments in Japan